Malassezia dermatis is a fungus that can cause opportunistic infections in animals.

References

Ustilaginomycotina
Parasitic fungi
Yeasts
Fungi described in 2002